Richard Hooker Wilmer (March 15, 1816 – June 14, 1900) was the second Bishop of Alabama in the Episcopal Church. Richard Wilmer was the only bishop to be consecrated by the Episcopal Church in the Confederate States of America (PECCSA).

Early and family life
He was born in Alexandria, Virginia, the son of the rector of Christ Church, William Holland Wilmer and his wife Marion Hannah Cox, who died in childbirth when Richard was six. His father, a prominent priest in Maryland as well as Virginia and from a family of priests, briefly served as the eleventh president of the College of William & Mary before his death in Williamsburg, Virginia, when Richard was only eleven. Raised in part by his stepmother (his eldest brother dying in Mississippi shortly after his father), Richard Wilmer worked as a teenager to support his family.

He graduated from Yale College in 1836 and the Virginia Theological Seminary in 1839.

Career
William Meade, Bishop of Virginia, ordained him as a deacon on March 31, 1839 and as a priest on April 19, 1840. He served parishes in Goochland and Fluvanna counties in Virginia, and then served as rector of St. James Church in Wilmington, North Carolina. Upon returning to Virginia, Wilmer served parishes in Clarke, Loudoun, Fauquier and Bedford counties. In 1858, he started a mission church in Henrico County which became Emmanuel Church at Brook Hill.

Episcopate
Shortly after the outbreak of the American Civil War, Virginia and other states seceded from the Union, a move Wilmer supported, as eventually did Meade. Nicholas H. Cobbs, Bishop of Alabama, a slaveholder who did not support secession, died in Montgomery, Alabama on January 11, 1861, the day his state's legislature voted to secede from the Union. Weeks later, Meade and other bishops of dioceses now in Confederate states met in Montgomery and decided to form the Episcopal Church in the Confederate States of America (PECCSA). A diocesan convention in Alabama voted to join the PECCSA in August, and on November 21, 1861, another Alabama diocesan meeting elected Richard Wilmer his successor. Wilmer accordingly resigned his position at Emmanuel Church effective at the years end. However, Bishops James Otey of Tennessee and Thomas Atkinson of North Carolina refused to participate in the necessary consecration ceremony before the PECCA held a convention and established its form of government. Since three bishops are needed for consecrations, the elderly and ill Meade traveled to Richmond for the consecration, and he, his assistant bishop John Johns, and bishop Stephen Elliott of Georgia, consecrated Wilmer as Bishop of Alabama on March 6, 1862 at St. Paul's Church. Meade died at a friend's house in Richmond shortly after that consecration.

After the Confederacy's defeat, Wilmer's consecration was ultimately accepted by a re-united Episcopal Church, although he remained an ardent Southern nationalist. He could not attend the first General Convention after the war because he was under house arrest for instructing his clergy to omit prayers for the President of the United States as a protest against military occupation. Nonetheless, the reunited church ratified his consecration.

Wilmer founded an order of deaconesses to care for Confederate widows and orphans, and by the time of his death in 1900, was the longest-serving Episcopal bishop. Although another Virginia priest, Henry Melville Jackson, assisted Wilmer in his last years, the diocese elected Robert Woodward Barnwell, a native of Selma, Alabama, as his successor.

Death and legacy
He is buried in the cemetery of Emmanuel Church at Brook Hill in Henrico County, Virginia, the parish at which he served before being called to Alabama. Libraries which hold his papers include the Birmingham Public Library, University of North Carolina, and the Episcopal Diocese of Maryland.

The community of Wilmer, Alabama is named in his honor.

References

External links
 Gaillard Hunt. Story of a Great Southern Bishop - Richard Hooker Wilmer, Episcopal Wit: How He Supported Confederacy and Fought Gen. Thomas. The New York Times, published January 25, 1908.

1816 births
1900 deaths
Episcopal bishops of Alabama
19th-century American Episcopalians
Pro-Confederate clergy
American slave owners